Albert Chester Krawczyk (born August 24, 1934) is an American politician who served three terms in the Vermont House of Representatives. Elected each time as a Democrat, he announced in November 2002 that he was switching to the Republican Party. He lost his 2004 bid for reelection as well as a 2006 rematch against Anne Lamy Mook. His cousin, Joseph L. Krawczyk Jr., served in the House from 2003 to 2011.

Electoral history

References

External links
Profile at Vote Smart

1934 births
Living people
People from Bennington, Vermont
People from Shaftsbury, Vermont
Military personnel from Vermont
Members of the Vermont House of Representatives
Vermont Democrats
Vermont Republicans
21st-century American politicians
20th-century American politicians
United States Army personnel of the Korean War